Paa Joe (with family name Joseph Tetteh-Ashong) is a Ghanaian figurative palanquin and fantasy coffin artist born 1947 at Akwapim in the Eastern Region of Ghana. Paa Joe is considered one of the most important Ghanaian coffin or abebuu adekai (“proverb boxes”) artists of his generation. He has been involved in the international art world since 1989, and has been included in major exhibitions in Europe, Japan, and the USA. His fantasy coffins are in the collections and on permanent display in many art museums worldwide, including the British Museum in London, the Brooklyn Museum in New York, The Royal Ontario museum in Canada ,Museum of fine Art in Boston ,the National Museum of Ethnology in Osaka and many others  as well as the private collections of foreign dignitaries. paa Joe is building an Art academy and gallery to support the community and art students across the globe

Biography

Paa Joe began his career with a twelve-year apprenticeship as a coffin artist in the workshop of Kane Kwei (1924–1992) in Teshie. In 1976, Paa Joe started his own business in Nungua. He trained many young artists like Daniel Mensah, Eric Kpakpo, or Kudjoe Affutu who have also become very successful fantasy coffin artists. In 2008, Paa Joe moved his workshop from Nungua to  kPobiman (Greater Accra) where he works with his son Jacob and several other collaborators. In 2013, Paa Joe was invited for a six-week residency to Nottingham, Great Britain and he has taken part in many art residences.

Art

Fantasy coffins 
While the pieces crafted by Paa Joe are real coffins that the deceased are buried in, the process to obtain a figurative coffin is very different from the normal process one might go about to obtain a coffin for themselves or a loved one. Paa Joe does not have a catalog of work from which a figurative coffin can be chosen, as might be done with a regular coffin. Each piece is a custom commission that has relevance to the deceased's life. Thus, Paa Joe is not a craftsman of utilitarian products, rather he is an artist of custom, expressive pieces. Not all of Paa Joe's coffins are used for burial or intended to express the quality of an individual life.

Figurative coffins have great cultural significance in Ghana. While the practice of making Figurative coffins was debatably started by Paa Joe's instructor, Kane Kwei, the concept has deep roots in Ga tradition. Figurative coffins have been around since the 1950s. However, figurative palanquins have a much deeper history in Ghana.

Paa Joe has crafted custom coffins for important Ghanaian cultural figures, such as the late Chief Nii Amartey Kwei II.

Workshop/process 
Paa Joe crafts his coffins in his workshop In the Accra area in Ghana. His workshop comprises a few main areas including an office, a showroom, a preparation room for painting and shipping, and a tool storage area. However, much of the actual Coffin Construction is performed behind the workshop under the shade of trees. Here, clients can come and view coffins and decide on a design either for themselves for future use, or for a loved one. Paa Joe's process is to explore the interests of the person in need of a coffin to determine what style of figurate coffin could best represent their life. Past examples have been as simple as a coke bottle or a bible to that of a professor who requested a bird with a pen in its mouth.

Other work 
While Paa Joe is best known for his figurative coffins, he has also created conceptual works that focus on West Africa and transatlantic slave trade, such as his large-scale sculptural work Gates of No Return.

Exhibitions 
In 2020 the High Museum of Art in Atlanta, Georgia exhibited new work by Joe of Gold Coast fortresses. The exhibit featured seven buildings that served as the way stations for Africans who were sold into slavery, put on ships, and sent to the Americas and the Caribbean in the sixteenth through nineteenth centuries. The works are large, painted wood architectural sculptures and include the Cape Coast Castle, Fort Orange, Christiansborg Castle, Fort Patience, and Fort St. Sebastian. The process of making the works included visits to the sites, taking pictures, and drawing sketches.

Solo and group exhibitions (selection) 
 2020 "Paa Joe: Gates of No Return", High Museum of Art, Atlanta
2017 Gallery 1957 "One does not take it anywhere."
2017 Jack Shainman Gallery "The Coffins of Paa Joe and the Pursuit of Happiness."
 2017 Fondation Cartier Paris
 2012 Brooklyn Museum
 2012 Southbank, UK
 2011 Salon 94 New York
 2011 Jack Bell Gallery, UK
 2011 V&A museum UK
 2010–11 "Living and Dying Gallery" British Museum London
 2007–2008 Six Feet Under, Deutsches Hygiene-Museum, Dresden
 2006 Melbourne Festival
 2006 Six Feet Under, Kunstmuseum Bern
 2005 Jack Shainman Gallery, New York City 
 2003 Schokolade, die süsse Verführung, Museum für Völkerkunde Basel
 2002 Autolust, Stapferhaus Lenzburg, Switzerland 
 1989 Les Magiciens de la terre, Centre Pompidou, Paris

Media coverage 
Paa Joe is the subject of a documentary about fantasy coffins by British filmmaker Ben Wigley and producer Anna Griffin.

List of references, media (selection) 
 2014 Regula Tschumi: Concealed Art. The figurative palanquins and coffins of Ghana. Edition Till Schaap, Bern. .
 2014 Regula Tschumi: The buried treasures of the Ga: Coffin art in Ghana. Edition Till Schaap, Bern. . A revised and updated second edition of Benteli 2008.
 2013 Regula Tschumi: The Figurative Palanquins of the Ga. History and Significance, in: African Arts, vol. 46, 4, p. 60-73.
 2015 Paa Joe and the Lion, a film by Ben Wigley (director) and Anna Griffin (producer), Notthingham, GB.
 2006. Regula Tschumi: Last Respect, First Honoured. Ghanaian Burial Rituals and Figural Coffins". In: Kunstmuseum Bern (Hg.): Six Feet Under. Exhibition Catalogue. Kerber, Bielefeld & Leipzig, p. 114-125.
 2004. Regula Tschumi: A Report on Paa Joe and the Proverbial Coffins of Teshie and Nungua, Ghana. In: Africa e Mediterraneo, no 47-48, p. 44-47.
 Thierry Secretan: Going into darkness,'' Hazan 1995.

References

External links 
 PAA JOE in: Eine fantastische Himmelsreise - Särge aus Ghana
 Paa Joe: The Ghanan coffin maker, Artikel von Achola Rosario in The Independent (Uganda) vom 20. Januar 2012

Ghanaian artists
Coffins
Ga-Adangbe people
Living people
21st-century sculptors
1947 births